The women's +78 kilograms (heavyweight) competition at the 2010 Asian Games in Guangzhou was held on 13 November at the Huagong Gymnasium.

Schedule
All times are China Standard Time (UTC+08:00)

Results
Legend
WO — Won by walkover

Main bracket

Repechage

References

Results

External links
 
 Draw

W79
Judo at the Asian Games Women's Heavyweight
Asian W79